300th may refer to:

1st Battalion, 300th Armored Cavalry Regiment, tank destroyer battalion of the United States Army active during World War II
300th (Tower Hamlets) Light Anti-Aircraft Regiment, Royal Artillery, unit of Britain's Territorial Force formed in 1908 from Volunteer corps dating back to 1859
300th (Worcestershire Yeomanry) Anti-Tank Regiment, Royal Artillery or Queen's Own Worcestershire Hussars, Yeomanry regiment of the British Army
300th Airlift Squadron, part of the 315th Airlift Wing at Charleston Air Force Base, South Carolina
300th anniversary of the Romanov dynasty, country-wide celebration, marked in the Russian Empire from February 1913, in celebration of the ruling Romanov Dynasty
300th Armored Cavalry Regiment, Texas-based reconnaissance unit of the United States Army Organized Reserve Corps, which briefly existed after World War II
300th Bomber Command, Polish World War II bomber unit
300th Field Artillery Regiment, Field Artillery regiment of the United States Army
300th Mechanized Regiment (Ukraine), formation of the Ukrainian Ground Forces
300th Military Intelligence Brigade (United States), United States Army formation, subordinate to the United States Army Intelligence and Security Command (INSCOM)
300th Sustainment Brigade (United States), Major Subordinate Command (MSC) of the 4th Expeditionary Sustainment Command (ESC)
Gothenburg 300th anniversary, a world's fair held in Gothenburg, Sweden during 1923 marking 300th anniversary of the founding of the city

See also
300 (number)
300 (disambiguation)
300, the year 300 (CCC) of the Julian calendar
300 BC